You Rise Above the World is a public art work by artist Richard Taylor. It is located on the Riverwalk in downtown Milwaukee, Wisconsin.  The artwork is a vertically oriented, abstract totem-like form painted bright red. It is located on the east side of the Milwaukee River on Kilbourn Avenue. The sculpture is sponsored by the Riverwalk Business Improvement District.

See also
 First Flight
 All in the Air at Once

References

Outdoor sculptures in Milwaukee
1998 sculptures
1998 establishments in Wisconsin
Abstract sculptures in Wisconsin
Aluminum sculptures in Wisconsin